Razorback is the name of two fictional characters appearing in American comic books published by Marvel Comics.

Publication history

The Buford Hollis version of Razorback first appeared in shadow in Peter Parker, the Spectacular Spider-Man #12. His first full appearance is in Peter Parker, the Spectacular Spider-Man #13 where he was created by Archie Goodwin, Bill Mantlo, and Sal Buscema.

Fictional character biography

Buford Hollis
Buford Hollis, a muscular truck driver and costumed adventurer from Texarkana, Arkansas, was in New York looking for his younger sister Bobby Sue who had joined a religious cult. This was in fact led by the villainous Man-Beast (disguised as the Hate-Monger) and it takes the combined efforts of Razorback and Spider-Man to defeat him and free Razorback's sister.

Taryn O'Connell, a female truck driver, spends some time searching for Razorback before he arrived in his oversized rig. They team up and use the rig itself to hijack NASA's experimental faster-than-light spacecraft, the Star Blazer. Though opposed by Mister Fantastic and She-Hulk, they nevertheless succeed in stealing the spaceship.

Their purpose is to find Taryn's lover, Ulysses Solomon Archer, who had left for deep space several years prior, establishing himself as a space trucker. They arrive (with She-Hulk as a stowaway, thanks to Mister Fantastic's assistance) only to discover that Archer had already married Taryn's rival for his affections, Mary McGrill, a woman who had traveled into space with him. Razorback assists She-Hulk and U.S. Archer in defeating Xemnu the Titan, who intended to transform Archer and Mary's as-yet-unborn child into a member of his own species. With the help of the She-Hulk's persuasion, NASA soon realizes that Razorback, with his mutant skill allowing him to drive anything, is the perfect pilot for their craft, and allows him and U.S. Archer to remain in space aboard the Star Blazer with NASA's approval. Taryn joins Buford on his travels, having fallen in love with him. Star Blazer is renamed the Big Pig III, which Razorback calls all his vehicles.

Razorback and Taryn eventually return to Earth, and Razorback inexplicably fights the Human Torch. Razorback has reportedly lost his mutant powers after M-Day, though his size and strength are unaffected.

During the "Secret Invasion" storyline, a Skrull infiltrator posing as Razorback appeared as a member of the Arkansas-based team called the Battalion. After the invasion is over, the real Razorback is shown in a support group meeting with the others that had been replaced by Skrulls. His teammate Tigra says she'd have left Camp Hammond to begin training him, as he was eager to take back the position which had been assumed by his Skrull replacement. Razorback doesn't take part to the clash against the Thor cyborg called Ragnarok, with Thor Girl being the only replaced heroine to face the powerful clone.

Hobgoblin's Razorback
During the AXIS storyline, an inverted Roderick Kingsley gave one of the copies of Razorback's costume to an unnamed person who became part of the Hob-Heroes.

Spider-Woman later encountered this Razorback.

During the Hunted storyline, Razorback is among the animal-themed characters that were captured by Taskmaster and Black Ant for Kraven the Hunter's Great Hunt which is sponsored by Arcade's company Arcade Industries. He was seen at a gathering held by Vulture. When the Great Hunt was over, Razorback was present when Human Fly, Toad, White Rabbit, and Yellowjacket planned to take revenge on Black Ant only for Taskmaster to make off with Black Ant.

Powers and abilities
Given his great size (6' 8", 410 lbs) and muscular build, Razorback possesses considerable (but not superhuman) strength and endurance. He is an excellent hand-to-hand combatant with street-fighting techniques, and wears a wild-boar cowl headpiece with a mane that can be electrified by activating a device on his gloves. This electrical discharge proved strong enough to incapacitate Spider-Man. During John Byrne's run on She-Hulk, it is revealed that Razorback is a mutant with the ability to intuitively pilot, drive or operate virtually any vehicle or mode of transportation, even if he does not know how the vehicle operates. Byrne later admitted this was meant as a parody and a reference to the trend at Marvel back then to reveal established characters as mutants. Razorback is a skilled mechanic and self-taught engineer who built two cab-over tractor-trailer trucks with sophisticated defensive systems, enhanced engines and self-drive capabilities (Big Pig I and Big Pig II).

In other media
Razorback made a number of appearances in the series of Marvel Comics novels published by Byron Preiss in the 1990s. The novels shared a common continuity and he was a recurring supporting character in the Spider-Man novels, as well as Generation X: Crossroads by J. Steven York. This novel ends with Razorback, who has won acclaim by saving the life of the President, wondering if he should risk his reputation by publicly revealing his mutant nature.

An alternate universe version of Razorback appears in the novel Spider-Man/X-Men: Time's Arrow, The Present by Tom DeFalco and Adam-Troy Castro, in a world where the X-Men were dictators who controlled all superheroes. He joined the resistance movement after the X-Men took Big Pig to pieces. Although more likeable than most of the team (which largely comprises villains), he is very bitter about the "death" of Big Pig. At one point Spider-Man thinks "I don't believe it. This Razorback is grim and gritty."

References

External links
 Razorback at Marvel.com

Characters created by Archie Goodwin (comics)
Characters created by Bill Mantlo
Characters created by Sal Buscema
Comics characters introduced in 1977
Fictional characters from Arkansas
Fictional engineers
Marvel Comics male superheroes
Marvel Comics mutants
Marvel Comics superheroes
Fictional truck drivers